Mamonino is a rural locality (a selo) in Vysokogorsky District, Tatarstan. The population was 191 as of 2010.

Geography 
Ayaz İle is located 17 km north of Zheleznodorozhnoy stantsii Vysokaya Gora, district's administrative centre, and 41 km north of Kazan, republic's capital, by road.

History 
The village already existed during the period of the Khanate of Kazan.

From 18th to the first half of the 19th centuries village's residents belonged to the social estate of privately owned peasants.

By the beginning of the twentieth century, village had a church, a zemstvo school, 2 watermills, 2 beer shops, a wine shop and 4 small shops.

Before the creation of the Tatar ASSR in 1920 was a part of Kazansky Uyezd of Kazan Governorate. Since 1920 was a part of Arsk Canton; after the creation of districts in Tatar ASSR (Tatarstan) in Dubyazsky (1930–1963),  Zelenodolsky (1963–1965) and Vysokogorsky districts.

References

External links 
 

Rural localities in Vysokogorsky District